Wadi Asimah is a seasonal watercourse in the Hajar Mountains of Ras Al Khaimah in the United Arab Emirates. It runs broadly westward from the village of Asimah to join the Wadi Fara, its confluence forming the locus between Wadi Fara and Wadi Sidr.

A popular location for day trippers and offroading, Wadi Asimah is notable for its lush greenery and agriculture. It is the site of the 'Sultan's Gardens', an area of abundant oleander, grasses, palm groves and pools that often (and unusually) harbours water year-round, as well as providing a nesting ground for heron. In winter, the mountainous wadi will receive heavy rainfall, leading to flash floods, and has even seen hail on occasion.

The villages of Asimah and Mawrid and the course of the Wadi Asimah were traditionally settled by members of the Mazari tribe.

Geology and archaeology 
Wadi Asimah is both a geologically and archaeologically rich area, with thick fluvial deposits and archaeological sites. Wadi Asimah has lent its name to the 'Asimah Window', an area of isoclinally folded metacherts formed by metamorphic events. 

The archeology of the area of Wadi Asimah yields signs of human habitation from the Neolithic to the present. Prehistoric incised arrowheads have been found in the area, which is also the site of an Umm Al Nar settlement, with finds including a bronze goblet, socketed spear-heads and dagger blades. A number of tombs from the late Umm Al Nar period were located at the edges of the wadi. Iron Age finds have also been made in the wadi.

Gallery

See also 
 List of wadis of the United Arab Emirates

References 

Rivers of the United Arab Emirates
Geography of the Emirate of Ras Al Khaimah
History of the United Arab Emirates